Mintopola dipartita is a moth of the subfamily Arctiinae. It was described by Reich in 1936. It is found in Brazil.

References

 Natural History Museum Lepidoptera generic names catalog

Lithosiini
Moths described in 1936